Silajit Majumder (born 9 October 1965), first name also spelled Shilajit, is an Indian Bengali male singer songwriter and actor from Kolkata. He is mostly credited by his first name. As an actor he is best known for his roles in films like Asukh (1999) by Rituparno Ghosh and Krantikaal (2005) by Sekhar Das. He took a remarkable place in Bigg Boss Bangla season 2.

Education
Majumder received his education at the Saint Paul K G school, the Scottish Church Collegiate School, and the Scottish Church College, before graduating from the Vidyasagar College of the University of Calcutta in English literature.

Works

Discography 
This is a list of music albums of Majumder

 Bhoomika (1994)
 Aamra o Benche Aachi (1995)
 Thik Ekhan e (1996)
 X=Prem (2000)
 X=2Prem (2001)
 Silajit er Paglami – Fisfis (2002)
 Lal Matir Sorane (2003)
 Rimjhim (2004)
 Sarbonash (2004)
 Folk Rock Aamra

Music director 
 Chupkatha (2012)
 Strugglers: The Reality Behind (2013)
 Manojder Adbhut Bari (2018)

Filmography 

 Feraoikytpo
Asukh (1999)
Y2K (Athoba, 'Sex Krome Aasitechhe') (2000) as Heeru
Sangee (2003) as Rana
Prohor (2004)
Mahulbanir Sereng (2004)
Krantikal (2005)
Ditiyo Basanto
Tobu...Aste Hobe Fire (2006)
Ram Balaram (2008)
Chhoy-e Chhuti (2008)
Tintorettor Jishu (2008)
Gandu (2010)
Bye Bye Bangkok (2011)
Jiyo Kaka (2011)
Katakuti (2011)
Hemlock Society (2012) as Siddhartha Roy
Chupkatha (2012)
Half Serious (2013)
Highway (2014)
Amar Sahor (2016) (A cop)
Otai Last MMS (2015) (Guest Appearance)
Manojder Adbhut Bari (2018) as Dacoit leader
Bhalo Maye Kharap Maye (2019) as Shabby
Saat Number Shanatan Sanyal (2019)
12 Seconds (Short) (2021) as Debanjan Mitra

TV 
 "Big Boss Bangla Season 2" (2016)

Web series
 Roktopolash (2022) as Dipankar

Books 
 Praptomonoskoder Jonyo (Abhijan Publishers, 2007)
 Aneke Poreni (Abhijan Publishers, 2009)
 Hijibiji (Abhijan Publishers, 2010)
 Aneke Poreni 2 (Abhijan Publishers, 2011)
 Shobodo-Sharir (Abhijan Publishers, 2012)
 36 ta Prem (Abhijan Publishers, 2012, written with Srijato & Kingshuk)

References

External links

1965 births
Living people
Male actors in Bengali cinema
Singers from Kolkata
Bengal Film Journalists' Association Award winners
Bengali singers
Bengali male actors
Indian male singer-songwriters
Indian singer-songwriters
Scottish Church Collegiate School alumni
Scottish Church College alumni
Vidyasagar College alumni
University of Calcutta alumni
Male actors from Kolkata
20th-century Indian singers
20th-century Indian male singers
Bigg Boss Bangla contestants